Mitsubishi–Jartazi was a professional cycling team based in Belgium from 2004 until 2007 and Estonia in 2008. It started as a Division III team in 2004, made the transition to UCI Continental in 2005 and became UCI Professional Continental in 2008. The team was managed by Patrick Stallaert. The sponsor, Jartazi, went on to sponsor Revor-Jartazi Cyclingteam in 2009.

Major wins

2004
Vlaamse Havenpijl, Peter Ronsse
2005
Stage 2b Le Triptyque des Monts et Châteaux, Michael Blanchy
Stage 2 Tour de l'Ain, Leonardo Duque
Druivenkoers Overijse, Leonardo Duque
2006
Stage 3 La Tropicale Amissa Bongo, Michael Blanchy
 Road Race Championship, Hamish Haynes
Internatie Reningelst, Robby Meul
Stage 2 Tour de l'Ain, Igor Abakoumov
Vlaamse Havenpijl, Vytautas Kaupas
2007
Stage 4 Tour de Picardie, Janek Tombak
Neuseen Classics, Denis Flahaut
Stage 3 OZ Wielerweekend, Denis Flahaut
Delta Profronde, Denis Flahaut
Stage 3 Boucles de la Mayenne, Janek Tombak
Halle–Ingooigem, Janek Tombak
Vlaamse Havenpijl, Denis Flahaut
GP de Beuvry-la-Forêt, Vytautas Kaupas
2008
La Tropicale Amissa Bongo, Maxime Vantomme
Stage 2 Étoile de Bessèges, Stefan Van Dijk
GP Cholet, Janek Tombak
Prologue Delta Tour Zeeland, Jens Mouris
Nationale Sluitingsprijs, Hans Dekkers

Noted riders

External links
Profile of 2004 team at the Cycling Website
Profile of 2005 team at the Cycling Website
Profile of 2006 team at the Cycling Website
Profile of 2007 team at the Cycling Website
Profile of 2008 team at the Cycling Website

Defunct cycling teams based in Belgium
Cycling teams based in Belgium
Cycling teams established in 2004
Cycling teams disestablished in 2008
Cycling teams based in Estonia